The San Antonio Street Circuit was a temporary street circuit located in San Antonio, Texas, which hosted IMSA GT Championship races between 1987 and 1990.

Lap records
The fastest official race lap records at the San Antonio Street Circuit are listed as:

References

Defunct motorsport venues in the United States
Motorsport venues in Texas
IMSA GT Championship circuits